The 11th Metro Manila Film Festival was held in 1985.

Ten movies participated in the 1985 Metro Manila Film Festival. Amazaldy Productions' Paradise Inn, a film by Celso Ad. Castillo received five major awards including the Best Picture and Best Actress for Vivian Velez among others. The second Best Picture, Triple A Films' The Moises Padilla Story: The Missing Chapter got four awards including the Best Actor for Anthony Alonzo and Best Screenplay for Tom Adrales. The third Best Picture, Lea Productions' Ano ang Kulay ng Mukha ng Diyos? received the most awards with six including the Best Director for Lino Brocka and Best Child Performer for Katrin Gonzales.

Entries

Winners and nominees

Awards
Winners are listed first and highlighted in boldface.

Multiple awards

References

External links

Metro Manila Film Festival
MMFF
MMFF